Gardenside is a neighborhood in southwestern Lexington, Kentucky, United States. Its boundaries are a combination of Darien Drive, Traveler Road, Appomattox Drive, and Alexandria Drive to the west, Wolf Run Creek to the north, Beacon Hill Drive to the east, and Lane Allen Road to the south.

Neighborhood statistics
Area: 
Population: 687
Population density: 
Median household income: $59,311

Public school districts
Elementary: James Lane Allen 
Middle: Beaumont 
High: Dunbar

References

External links
 http://www.city-data.com/neighborhood/Gardenside-Lexington-KY.html

Neighborhoods in Lexington, Kentucky